Taiyafeh-ye Ali Jan (also Romanized as Ţāīyafeh-ye ʿAlī Jān) is a village in Howmeh-ye Jonubi Rural District, in the Central District of Eslamabad-e Gharb County, Kermanshah Province, Iran. At the 2006 census, its population was 14, in 4 families.

References 

Populated places in Eslamabad-e Gharb County